Adrien Viguier, full name Joseph Étienne Adrien Viguier, (20 January 1805 – 10 December 1884,) pen name Adrien Delaville, was a 19th-century French writer, playwright, and literary critic.

Works 
1825: Le Sacre de Charlemagne, Ladvocat 
1838: Chérubin, ou le Page de Napoléon, comédie-vaudeville in 2 acts, by MM. Edmond de Biéville, Adrien Viguier, and Adrien Payn... Paris, Ambigu-comique, 10 October 1835, Marchant
1827: Traité de la traduction, ou L'art de traduire le latin en français, 23 p., Édition : Paris : Brunot-Labbe, Text online
1842: Roger, pseudonym Adrien Delaville
1844: Régine, Au Comptoir des imprimeurs-unis
1844: Le Dernier des touristes, humour, by Adrien Delaville, H. Souverain 
1845: Les Deux César, comédie-vaudeville en un acte, by M. Arvers... [Paris, Gymnase-Dramatique, 17 February 1845.]; In-4° à 2 col., 19 p.Description : Note : Rédigé avec la collaboration d'Adrien Viguier, after Vapereau. - Répertoire dramatique des auteurs contemporains, 286; Édition : Paris : l'Éditeur du Répertoire dramatique et Tresse, 1845; Auteur du texte : Félix Arvers (1806-1850)
1844: Épopée, In-12, 172 p., Note : Ce titre figure dans la liste des œuvres d'A. Viguier en tête de son roman : "Roger", avec la mention : "roman de la Révolution de juillet"; Édition : Paris : au Comptoir des éditeurs réunis
1849: Love. Débuts. 2e édition, Comon 
1851: Aperçus littéraires, by Adrien Delaville, Comptoir des imprimeurs-unis 
1863: Armelle, ou La pauvre villageoise, pseudonym Adrien Delaville
1870: La légende de Jeanne d'Arc, In-18, XXVIII-211 p., Description : Note : Reçu à correction au Théâtre-français; Édition : Paris : E. Dentu
1876: Napoleo epicus,2 vol. in-18; Description : Note : Par A. Viguier, d'après sa dédicace ms. sur le deuxième ex. - La préface est datée de 1874; Édition : Paris : Vanier

References

External links 
 Note dans le Dictionnaire des pseudonymes de Georges d'Heylli

19th-century French novelists
19th-century French dramatists and playwrights
French literary critics
Chevaliers of the Légion d'honneur
1805 births
People from Béziers
1884 deaths